Gail Ann O'Grady (born January 23, 1963), an American actress and producer, is best known for her roles on television. Her roles include Donna Abandando in the ABC police drama NYPD Blue, and Helen Pryor in the NBC drama series American Dreams. O'Grady is also well known for her lead roles in a number of television movies. She has been nominated for a Primetime Emmy Awards three times.

Early life
O'Grady was born in Detroit, Michigan, the daughter of Jim and Jan O'Grady. Her father was a financial planner. She was raised in Wheaton, Illinois, and graduated from Wheaton North High School in 1981. She appeared in a few commercials before moving to Los Angeles in 1986.

Career
O'Grady began her career as a model for Montgomery Ward and as an actor in several commercials. In one commercial, she played the neighbor for whom Michael J. Fox's character chases down a Diet Pepsi. In time, she began making guest appearances, often as a villain. She made her big screen debut in the 1988 romantic comedy She's Having a Baby, and later was cast for two episodes on the ABC drama China Beach. She also guest starred on several other shows, and appeared in made for television and independent movies.

Her first major role was as Donna Abandando on the ABC police drama NYPD Blue. O'Grady played the big-haired squad secretary from 1993 to 1996, and for each year received an Emmy Award nomination for Outstanding Supporting Actress in a Drama Series. Along with the cast, she won Screen Actors Guild Award for Outstanding Performance by an Ensemble in a Drama Series in 1995. O'Grady left the series in 1996, and made a pilot for her own sitcom, The Gail O'Grady Project, but the show was not picked up by any of the networks.

After leaving NYPD Blue, O'Grady began starring in numerous television movies for Lifetime and other networks, including The Three Lives of Karen (1997), Two Voices (1997), Every 9 Seconds (1997), Two of Hearts (1999), Another Woman's Husband (2000), Lip Service (2000), Hostage Negotiator (2001), Hope Ranch (2002), Lucky 7 (2003), Sex and the Single Mom (2003), and More Sex & the Single Mom (2005). Her big screen credits include Celtic Pride (1996), That Old Feeling (1997), Deuce Bigalow: Male Gigolo (1999) and Walking Across Egypt (1999).

From 2002 to 2005, O'Grady starred as Helen Pryor in the NBC television series American Dreams, which depicted an all-American family living in Philadelphia, Pennsylvania, during the 1960s. The series was canceled after three seasons. In Fall 2005, O'Grady was lead actress in the ABC comedy series Hot Properties, which was canceled after 13 episodes. In 2006, she guest starred on Two and a Half Men, and in 2007 had a recurring role on Boston Legal as Gloria Weldon, a judge in a personal relationship with attorney Alan Shore. Also in 2007, she starred in the Hallmark Channel movie All I Want for Christmas.

O'Grady had regular roles on the short-lived CW series Hidden Palms as Karen Hardy in 2007, and on Hellcats, playing Wanda Perkins, the mother of the main character, from 2010 to 2011. In 2008, she had a recurring role on the ABC series Desperate Housewives as Anne Schilling, a woman who is having an affair with the character Porter Scavo (at that point a teenager). She has made appearances on Monk, CSI: Crime Scene Investigation, The Mentalist, Law & Order: Special Victims Unit, Drop Dead Diva, Hawaii Five-0, and Castle. From 2014 to 2015, she had a major recurring role as Conrad's first wife on ABC primetime soap opera Revenge, opposite Madeleine Stowe.

In 2019, O'Grady starred in the Lifetime film Identity Theft of a Cheerleader (which was inspired by the identity theft committed by Wendy Brown) as Angie Patterson, the mother of Maiara Walsh's character Vicky Patterson.

Personal life
O'Grady has been married and divorced six times. After breaking up with artist Robert Claypool, she sought a restraining order against him in 1995, claiming he was stalking her, but did not obtain one. He responded by suing her for defamation, libel and slander. 

In 2004, before her sixth marriage, to John Stamatakis, O'Grady gave birth to her first child with her ex-boyfriend Chris Byers, son Michael Colton O'Grady, named after her late brother.

Filmography

Film

Television films

Television series

References

External links

1963 births
Living people
20th-century American actresses
21st-century American actresses
Actors from Wheaton, Illinois
Actresses from Illinois
American film actresses
American television actresses
American people of Irish descent